This is a list of club owners in the National Rugby League (NRL), the top league of professional rugby league clubs in Australasia.

Current clubs

See also

List of Super League rugby league club owners
List of professional sports team owners

References

13.https://mywests.imgix.net/assets/src/uploads/Wests-31-January-2021-FS-Signed.pdf

External links

National Rugby League lists
Rugby league chairmen and investors
Sports owners